is a city located in Niigata Prefecture, Japan. , the city had an estimated population of 55,354 in 20,047 households, and a population density of 96.1 persons per km².

Geography

Minamiuonuma is situated in a valley in a mountainous region of Niigata Prefecture known as “Snow Country” because of the heavy snowfall in winter. The city is bounded by Uonuma and the Echigo-Sanzan mountains in the north, and Yuzawa, a popular ski resort town, in the south. The Uono River flows through most of the city. The city and its surrounding areas are dotted with many onsen (hot springs) and ski resorts, making it a popular destination in winter. There are also a large number of paddy fields, and popular seasonal fruit like watermelon, as this is part of the major koshihikari rice-growing region in Japan. Parts of the city are within the borders of the Jōshin'etsu-kōgen National Park.

Surrounding municipalities
Niigata Prefecture
Uonuma
Tōkamachi
Yuzawa
Gunma Prefecture
Minakami

Climate
Minamiuonuma has a Humid climate (Köppen Cfa) characterized by warm, wet summers and cold winters with heavy snowfall.  The average annual temperature in Minamiuonuma is 11.3 °C. The average annual rainfall is 1865 mm with September as the wettest month. The temperatures are highest on average in August, at around 24.3 °C, and lowest in January, at around -1.1 °C.

Demographics
Per Japanese census data, the population of Minamiuonuma peaked around 1950 and has since declined to about the same level as a century ago.

History

The area of present-day Minamiuonuma was part of ancient Echigo Province. The village of Muikamachi was created with the establishment of the modern municipalities system on April 1, 1889 and was raised to town status on July 13, 1900. The city of Minamiuonuma was established on November 1, 2004, from the merger of the towns Muikamachi with the neighboring town of Yamato (both from Minamiuonuma District). On October 1, 2005, the town of Shiozawa (from Minamiuonuma District) was also merged into Minamiuonuma.

Government

Minamiuonuma has a mayor-council form of government with a directly elected mayor and a unicameral city legislature of 22 members. Minamiuonuma, together with the town of Yuzawa, contributes two members to the Niigata Prefectural Assembly. In terms of national politics, the city is part of Niigata 5th district of the lower house of the Diet of Japan.

Economy

The economy of Minamiuonuma is based primarily on agriculture and seasonal tourism.

Education
Minamiuonuma has 17 public elementary schools and four public middle schools operated by the city government. There are four public high schools operated by the Niigata Prefectural Board of Education, and the prefecture also operate one special education school for the handicapped. The International University of Japan is based at Minamiuonuma.

Transportation

Railway
East Japan Railway Company (JR East) - Jōetsu Shinkansen 
 Urasa Station 
 JR East - Jōetsu Line 
 -  -  -  -  -  -  - 
   Hokuetsu Express Hokuhoku Line 
  -

Highway
  Kan-etsu Expressway – Shiozawa-Ishiuchi IC, Muikamachi IC

Twin towns – sister cities

Minamiuonuma is twinned with:
 Ashburton, New Zealand (1987)
 Lillehammer, Norway (1992)
 Sölden, Austria (1982)

Local attractions

Sakado Castle ruins, a National Historic Site

References

External links

Official Website 

 
Cities in Niigata Prefecture